Shift is the fourth and final studio album by the Swedish grindcore band Nasum. It was released on October 26, 2004, by Burning Heart Records in Sweden and on Relapse Records in North America. Two months after this album was released, Mieszko Talarczyk died during the 2004 tsunami, resulting in the disbanding of Nasum.

Track listing

Personnel

Nasum
Mieszko Talarczyk – guitar, vocals, recording, mixing
Anders Jakobson – drums, artwork
Urban Skytt – guitar
Jon Lindqvist – bass guitar

Additional personnel
Petter Samuel Freed – guitar (2, 22)
Rogga Johansson – vocals
Peter in de Betou – mastering
Robert Johansson – photography
Robert Samsonowitz – artwork, design

References

Nasum albums
Relapse Records albums
Burning Heart Records albums
2004 albums